Charaxes dreuxi, the Dreux's demon charaxes, is a butterfly in the family Nymphalidae. It is found in Guinea and Ivory Coast. The butterfly's habitat is tropical evergreen forests.

References

Butterflies described in 1977
dreuxi